This list of cities in Mali tabulates all the largest communes in the country of Mali (including those in the north-eastern portion where the Mali Government no longer exercises de facto control). Besides the largest cities and towns (all urban communes are shown), this table also includes other large rural communes with a population in excess of 50,000.

By far the largest agglomeration in Mali is the capital, Bamako, with a population of 1,809,106 (at the 2009 Census). Thus about 12½ percent of Mali's population lives in Bamako.

Cities
The following table lists all communes with over 50,000 population from the 1 April 2009 census, together with the higher-level administrative unit (région) and second-level unit (cercle) in which each is situated. The population figures refer to the real city (i.e. commune) without any suburbs in neighbouring communes.

Bamako is a separate capital district and is not within any région or cercle; it comprises six urban communes (not individually listed in the table below), which are numbered rather than named.

The next table lists all the remaining urban communes with under 50,000 population from the 1 April 2009 census, together with the higher-level administrative unit (région) and second-level unit (cercle) in which each is situated. The population figures refer to the real city (i.e. commune) without any suburbs in neighbouring communes.

References

External links

Mali, List of cities in
 
Mali
Cities